Brown bread is bread made with significant amounts of whole grain flour.

Brown bread may also refer to:

 Freddie Foreman, known as "Brown Bread Fred"
 Cockney rhyming slang for dead
 Making of Bread, etc. Act 1800, also known as the Brown Bread Act